Actenicerus siaelandicus is a species of click beetle belonging to the family Elateridae, subfamily Dendrometrinae.

This beetle is present in most of Europe, in the East Palearctic realm and in the Nearctic realm.

One of preferred host-plants are Carex species.

The whole body is bronzed-brownish or auburn-purplish, with a greyish pubescence.

References

Bibliography
 Mendel, H & Clarke, R. E., 1996, Provisional Atlas of the click beetles of (Coleoptera: Elateroidea) of Britain and Ireland, Ipswich Borough Council Museums, Ipswich
 Speight, M. C. D., 1989, The Irish Elaterid and Buprestid fauna (Coleoptera: Elateridae and Buprestidae), Bulletin of the Irish Biogeographical Society, 12: 31-62

External links
 Biolib
 Fauna Europaea
 Elateridae
 Habitas

Elateridae
Beetles of Europe
Beetles described in 1764
Taxa named by Otto Friedrich Müller